Rebentischia is a genus in the Tubeufiaceae family of fungi.

The genus name of Rebentischia is in honour of Johann Friedrich Rebentisch (1772-1810), who was a Polish-German botanist (Bryology, Mycology and  Algology) from Neumark. 

The genus was circumscribed by Petter Adolf Karsten in Syll. Fungorum (Saccardo) vol.2 on page 12 in 1883.

Species
As accepted by Species Fungorum;
 Rebentischia abietis  
 Rebentischia anodendri  
 Rebentischia brevicaudata  
 Rebentischia costi  
 Rebentischia elaeodendri  
 Rebentischia massalongoi  
 Rebentischia pomiformis  
 Rebentischia taurica  
 Rebentischia thujana  
 Rebentischia unicaudata  

Former species;
 R. appendiculosa (Berk. & Broome) Sacc. (1876), now Anthostomella appendiculosa Xylariaceae familly
 R. typhae Fabre (1879), now Buergenerula typhae Magnaporthaceae family

References

External links
Rebentischia at Index Fungorum

Tubeufiaceae